Hebe Maria Monteiro de Camargo Ravagnani  (8 March 1929 – 29 September 2012) was a Brazilian television host, singer and actress. She is considered the "Queen of Brazilian Television". She died at her home on 29 September 2012. Her net worth was over US$360 million.

Early years
Hebe Camargo was born on Friday, an International Women's Day of 1929, in Taubaté, São Paulo, was the daughter of Esther Magalhães Camargo and Sigesfredo Monteiro de Camargo, both of Portuguese origin, She began her career as a singer in the 1940s with her sister Estela, as Rosalinda e Florisbela. During her singing career, Camargo performed sambas and boleros in nightclubs. She left her musical career to devote more time to radio and television. She was invited by Assis Chateaubriand to attend the first live broadcast of Brazilian television, in the neighborhood of Sumaré, São Paulo, Brazil.

Career
As a singer, Camargo appeared in comedy films by Mazzaropi and starred with Agnaldo Rayol in one of them. In the 1950s, she entered television and worked as a presenter in a series on TV Paulista. In 1955, Camargo appeared in the first program for women on Brazilian television, O Mundo é das Mulheres (The World belongs to Women), on television in Rio de Janeiro, which aired five times a week.

In the 1960s, Camargo moved to the Rede Record network, where, for many years, she maintained a top-rated program. During the Jovem Guarda era, Hebe gave way to new talent. On Easter Sunday, 10 April 1966, the network began broadcasting a Sunday program featuring Camargo as an interviewer. This show was sponsored by the Brazilian airline, Varig, with an advertising featuring Camargo.

Camargo was seen on almost every television station in Brazil, including the Rede Record and Rede Bandeirantes, in the 1970s and 1980s.

In 1980, after a long hiatus she returned to work as an interviewer. From March 1986 to December 2010, Camargo was on the SBT Network, where she presented the television program Hebe, which became one of the network's longest-running programs. The show was also broadcast on Rede Tupi and Rede Bandeirantes, and had a spin-off show Hebe por Elas (Hebe for Them) in the early 1990s. She also presented Fora do Ar, and participated in Telethon, comedy specials, and Romeu e Julieta, in which she starred with Ronald Golias and Nair Bello.

In 1995, EMI released a CD of Camargo's greatest hits. On Easter Saturday, 22 April 2006, she celebrated her thousandth program on the SBT. She also has participated in social activities, such as taking part in the Cansei movement, a 2007 protest critical of the Brazilian government.

Camargo was spending New Year's Eve in Miami when she complained of severe abdominal pain. A bulletin issued by the hospital later reported that Hebe was subjected to a diagnostic laparoscopy, which found cancer. On 8 January 2010, Camargo was admitted to Albert Einstein Hospital in São Paulo for surgery to remove cancer from the peritoneum. After surgery and chemotherapy, she returned to work on the International Women's Day of 2010, your 81st birthday.

Illness and death
Camargo suffered from cancer since 2010. She died at 11:45 AM (14:45 GMT) on Saturday, 29 September 2012, having probably suffered a cardiac arrest while she was sleeping.

On popular culture
 Hebe – The Musical was a theatrical production directed by Miguel Falabella and performed by Débora Reis from January to April 2018.
 Hebe (2019) will be a movie based in the Hebe's life journey and career, it would be produced and directed by Cáca Diegues, but afterward, Maurício Farias replaced him. The actress Andréa Beltrão will perform the presenter and the actor Daniel Boaventura will perform Silvio Santos.
 "Hebe: Forever" (2019) – on display from this Tuesday until 2 June in Farol Santander, in São Paulo. The immersive and interactive exhibition remembers the career of the singer and presenter that left a mark in the history of Brazilian television.

Awards and honors
 1990 — "The face of São Paulo"
 1994 — "Citizen Paulistana" from the Câmara Municipal
 2002 — "Tribute in Portugal"
 2007 — "Special Award", for Prêmio Contigo!
 2009 — "Title of Professor Honoris Causa" of the Universidade FIAM-FAAM
 2010 — "Award LIDE 2010" of the Comitê Executivo do Grupo de Líderes Empresariais
 2010 — "Latin Grammy Awards- Trustees Award"
 "Best Interview" of the Associação Paulista dos Críticos de Artes
 "Best auditorium program presenter" of the Brazilian Academy of Letters

Filmography
 2009 – Xuxa e o Mistério de Feiurinha
 2005 – Coisa de Mulher
 2000 – Dinosaur (Portuguese dubbing of Baylene)
 1960 – Zé do Periquito
 1951 – Liana, a Pecadora
 1949 – Quase no Céu

Television career

 2010 – Fantástico
 2010 – SBT Brasil
 2009 – Elas Cantam Roberto
 2009 – Vende-se Um Véu de Noiva
 2007 – Amigas e Rivais
 2003 – Romeu e Julieta Versão 3
 2000 – TV Ano 50
 1995 – A Escolinha do Golias
 1990 – Romeu e Julieta Versão 2
 1980 – Cavalo Amarelo
 1978 – O Profeta
 1970 – As Pupilas do Senhor Reitor
 1968 – Romeu e Julieta Versão 1
 1950 – Primeira Apresentação Musical da TV Brasileira

Discography
 Sou Eu (1960)
 Hebe comanda o espetáculo (1961)
 E Vocês (1963)
 Hebe (1964)
 Hebe 65 (1965)
 Hebe (1967)
 Pra Você (1998)
 Hebe Camargo & Convidados (2001)
 Hebe Mulher e Amigos (2010)
 Mulher (2010)

See also

 Sistema Brasileiro de Televisão
 List of television presenters

References

External links

 
 Site of Hebe program at RedeTV!

1929 births
2012 deaths
People from Taubaté
20th-century Brazilian women singers
20th-century Brazilian singers
Brazilian film actresses
Brazilian people of Portuguese descent
Brazilian socialites
Brazilian television actresses
Deaths from cancer in São Paulo (state)
Television pioneers
Brazilian women television presenters